SOCAR Star Oil Refinery or SOCAR STAR Oil Refinery is an oil refinery in Aliaga, western Turkey. It is owned and operated by SOCAR.

See also 
 Oil and gas in Turkey

References 

Oil refineries in Turkey
Aliağa District